J. elegans may refer to:
 Jinfengopteryx elegans, a maniraptoran dinosaur species found in China
 Joinvillea elegans, a flowering plant species found in New Caledonia